Christine Pepelyan  (born April 22, 1980), is an Armenian broadcaster and singer. In 2013, she was one of the jury members of The Voice of Armenia, in addition, the winner of The Voice was from her team. In 2017, Pepelyan appeared as a special guest in a musical program called "Benefis", which is about the most prominent Armenian singers and songwriters. Later, she participated a new project for helping all the children who suffer from cancer. Many Armenian famous singers were also participating, such as Mkrtich Arzumanyan, Iveta Mukuchyan, Mihran Tsarukyan, Erik, and Aram MP3.

Discography
 Vor Hishes (2004)
 About Me (2005)
 Live in Concert (2007)
 The Best (2009)
 New Hits (2010)
 The Best Of (2011)
 Shnorhakal Em (2013)
 Live Concert in Yerevan (2014)

Filmography

References

External links 
Christine Pepelyan's biography
Article about her
Article about her
Article about her
Кристине MySpace

1980 births
Living people
Musicians from Yerevan
21st-century Armenian women singers
Armenian pop singers